Oleh Mazurenko (born 8 November 1977) is a Ukrainian professional footballer and football manager.

Career
He played for Obolon Kyiv in the Ukrainian Premier League.

Mazurenko played for Mykolaiv, Illychivets and Obolon before joining Desna in the summer of 2008. He had a trial with Chornomorets in January 2009, but was injured and did not join the club.

References

External links 

1977 births
Living people
Footballers from Kyiv
Ukrainian footballers
FC Dynamo-2 Kyiv players
FC Dynamo-3 Kyiv players
FC Volyn Lutsk players
MFC Mykolaiv players
FC Mariupol players
FC Illichivets-2 Mariupol players
FC Desna Chernihiv players
FC Obolon-Brovar Kyiv players
FC Bucha players
Ukrainian Premier League players
Ukrainian expatriate footballers
Expatriate footballers in Russia
Ukrainian football managers
FC Obolon Kyiv managers
FC Obolon-2 Kyiv managers
Association football midfielders